Go West, Man! is the second studio album by Quincy Jones. It was released in 1957 by ABC Records.

Track listing
 "Dancin' Pants" (Jimmy Giuffre) – 3:50
 "Blues Day" (Giuffre) – 4:40
 "Bright Moon" (Giuffre) – 5:20
 "No Bones at All" (Johnny Mandel) – 3:58
 "The Oom Is Blues" (Charlie Mariano) – 5:10
 "Be My Guest" (Lennie Niehaus) – 4:29
 Medley: "What's New?" - Bill Perkins solo (Bob Haggart, Johnny Burke) / "We'll Be Together Again" - Pepper Adams solo (Carl Fischer, Frankie Laine) / "Time on My Hands" - Buddy Collette solo (Vincent Youmans);  / "You Go to My Head" - Carl Perkins solo (J. Fred Coots, Haven Gillespie);  / "Laura" - Walter Benton solo (David Raksin / Johnny Mercer)  – 6:17
 "London Derriere" (Johnny Mandel) – 4:06
 "Kings Road Blues" (Lennie Niehaus) – 5:06

Personnel
 Quincy Jones – conductor
 Conte Candoli (2, 4, 8) – trumpet
 Pete Candoli (2, 4, 8) – trumpet
 Harry Edison (2, 4, 8) – trumpet
 Jack Sheldon (2, 4, 8) – trumpet
 Benny Carter (1, 6, 9) – alto saxophone
 Herb Geller (1, 6, 9) – alto saxophone
 Charlie Mariano (1, 6, 9) – alto saxophone
 Art Pepper (1, 6, 9) – alto saxophone
 Pepper Adams (3, 5, 7) – baritone saxophone
 Walter Benton (3, 5, 7) – tenor saxophone
 Buddy Collette (3, 5, 7) – tenor saxophone
 Bill Perkins (3, 5, 7) – tenor saxophone
 Lou Levy (1, 6, 9) – piano
 Carl Perkins (2-5, 7-8) – piano
 Red Mitchell (1, 6, 9) – bass
 Leroy Vinnegar (2–5, 7–8) – bass
 Shelly Manne (1, 3, 5–7, 9) – drums
 Mel Lewis (2, 4, 8) – drums

References

1957 albums
Quincy Jones albums
Albums produced by Quincy Jones
Mercury Records albums
Albums conducted by Quincy Jones
ABC Records albums
Albums arranged by Quincy Jones